The Amiens 8th (Nord) Canton is a former canton situated in the department of the Somme and in the Picardy region of northern France. It was disbanded following the French canton reorganisation which came into effect in March 2015. It had 16,103 inhabitants (2012).

Geography 
The canton was organised around the commune of Amiens in the arrondissement of Amiens. The altitude varies from 14m at Amiens, to 131m at Poulainville for an average of 44m.

The canton comprised 3 communes:
Allonville
Amiens (partly)
Poulainville

See also
 Arrondissements of the Somme department
 Cantons of the Somme department
 Communes of the Somme department

References

Amiens 8
Canton 8
2015 disestablishments in France
States and territories disestablished in 2015